Dr. Haji Mamad Puteh (born 5 August 1956) is a Malaysian politician and the current Assembly Member for Kuala Berang in Terengganu under PAS ticket for the second time.

Mamad was elected for the first time to be in Terengganu State Legislative Assembly by representing Kuala Berang during 1999 election with 7,707 votes. after 2004 election, his seat was stolen by Komarudin Abdul Rahman from Barisan Nasional. He once again took over the seat in 2018 with the majority of 1,070.

Mamad was born in Kampung Rhu Dua, Marang, Terengganu and currently staying in Kampung Sungai Petai, Kuala Berang for more than 30 years.

Election results

References 

People from Terengganu
Living people
1956 births
Malaysian politicians
Malaysian Muslims